Amy Williams (born 15 December 1986) is a female rugby union player. She represented  and Hawke's Bay.

Williams made her provincial debut for Hawke's Bay in 2003 while attending Karamu High School. In 2004, she played touch rugby for New Zealand's under 19 team. She has played for the Aotearoa Māori Sevens team.

Williams made her international debut as an 18 year old for the Black Ferns on 29 June 2005 against Scotland at Ottawa. She was in the squad that won their third Rugby World Cup title at the 2006 tournament in Canada.

In 2015, Williams began a 10-month stint with Bologna in Italy's Serie A competition and coached their under-16 girls team as well.

References

External links
Black Ferns Profile

1986 births
Living people
New Zealand women's international rugby union players
New Zealand female rugby union players
Female rugby union players
Place of birth missing (living people)